The 1949 Gent–Wevelgem was the 11th edition of the Gent–Wevelgem cycle race and was held on 3 April 1949. The race started in Ghent and finished in Wevelgem. The race was won by Marcel Kint.

General classification

References

Gent–Wevelgem
1949 in road cycling
1949 in Belgian sport
April 1949 sports events in Europe